John Lowry may refer to:

 John Lowry (baseball) (fl. 1875), American professional baseball player
 John Lowry (Irish politician), General Secretary of the Workers' Party
 John Lowry (Parliamentarian) (died 1669), English politician
 John D. Lowry (1932–2012), Canadian film restoration expert and innovator

See also
 John Lowery (disambiguation)